Amboyna or amboina may refer to:

 Amboyna (play), a play by John Dryden
Amboyna massacre, in 1623 in Indonesia
 Amboina box turtle (Cuora amboinensis), of Asia
 Amboina king parrot (Alisterus amboinensis), of Indonesia
 Amboyna (genus), a moth genus
 Amboyna burl of Pterocarpus trees
 Ambon Island, sometimes named Amboyna, part of the Maluku Islands of Indonesia
 Ambon, Maluku, a city on Ambon Island

See also
 Amboine, a tree, Pterocarpus indicus
 Callionymus amboina, a Pacific fish